Golviran (also Romanized as Golvīrān; also known as Golūrān) is a village in Charuymaq-e Markazi Rural District, in the Central District of Charuymaq County, East Azerbaijan Province, Iran. At the 2006 census, its population was 83, in 17 families.

References 

Populated places in Charuymaq County